Schwartz's reagent is the common name for the organozirconium compound with the formula (C5H5)2ZrHCl, sometimes called zirconocene hydrochloride or zirconocene chloride hydride, and is named after Jeffrey Schwartz, a chemistry professor at Princeton University. This metallocene is used in organic synthesis for various transformations of alkenes and alkynes.

Preparation
The complex was first prepared by Wailes and Weigold.  It can be purchased or readily prepared by reduction of zirconocene dichloride with lithium aluminium hydride:

 (C5H5)2ZrCl2  +   LiAlH4  →  (C5H5)2ZrHCl  +   LiAlCl4

This reaction also affords (C5H5)2ZrH2, which is treated with methylene chloride to give Schwartz's reagent  LiAl(O-t-Bu)3H can be used in place of LiAlH4.

An alternative procedure that generated Schwartz's reagent from dihydride has also been reported. Moreover, it's possible to perform an in situ preparation of (C5H5)2ZrHCl from zirconocene dichloride by using LiH. This method can also be used to synthesize isotope-labeled molecules, like olefines by employing Li2H or Li3H as reducing agents.

Schwartz's reagent has a low solubility in common organic solvents.  The trifluoromethanesulfonate (C5H5)2ZrH(OTf) is soluble in THF.

Structure
The complex adopts the usual "clam-shell" structure seen for other Cp2MXn complexes. The dimetallic structure has been confirmed by Microcrystal electron diffraction.  The results are consistent with FT-IR spectroscopy, which established that the hydrides are bridging. Solid state NMR spectroscopy also indicates a dimeric structure.  The X-ray crystallographic structure for the methyl compound (C5H5)4Zr2H2(CH3)2 compound is analogous.

Uses in organic synthesis
Schwartz's reagent reduces amides to aldehydes.

Vinylation of ketones in high yields is a possible use of Schwartz's reagent.

Schwartz's reagent has been used in the synthesis of some macrolide antibiotics, (−)-motuporin, and antitumor agents.

Hydrozirconation
Hydrozirconation is a form of hydrometalation.  Substrates for hydrozirconation are alkenes and alkynes. With terminal alkynes the terminal vinyl zirconium product is predominantly formed. Secondary reactions are nucleophilic additions, transmetalations, conjugate additions, coupling reactions, carbonylation and halogenation.

Computational studies indicate that hydrozirconation occurs from the interior portion.
When treated with one equivalent of Cp2ZrClH, diphenylacetylene gives the corresponding alkenylzirconium as a mixture of cis and trans isomers. With two equivalents of hydride, the endproduct was a mixture of erythro and threo zircono alkanes:

In 1974 Hart and Schwartz reported that the organozirconium intermediates react with electrophiles such as hydrochloric acid, bromine and acid chlorides to give the corresponding alkane, bromoalkanes, and ketones:
 

The corresponding organoboron and organoaluminum compounds were already known, but these are air-sensitive and/or pyrophoric whereas organozirconium compounds are not.

Scope
In one study the usual regioselectivity of an alkyne hydrozirconation is reversed with the addition of zinc chloride:

One example of a one-pot hydrozirconation - carbonylation - coupling is depicted below:

With certain allyl alcohols, the alcohol group is replaced by nucleophilic carbon forming a cyclopropane ring: The selectivity of the hydrozirconation of alkynes has been studied in detail. Generally, the addition of the Zr–H proceeds via the syn-addition. The rate of addition to unsaturated carbon-carbon bonds is terminal alkyne > terminal alkene ≈ internal alkyne > disubstituted alkene  Acyl complexes can be generated by insertion of CO into the C–Zr bond resulting from hydrozirconation. Upon alkene insertion into the zirconium hydride bond, the resulting zirconium alkyl undergoes facile rearrangement to the terminal alkyl and therefore only terminal acyl compounds can be synthesized in this way. The rearrangement most likely proceeds via β-hydride elimination followed by reinsertion.

Further reading

References

External links

Examples in organic synthesis at the University of Connecticut website

Metallocenes
Organozirconium compounds
Cyclopentadienyl complexes
Reagents for organic chemistry
Chloro complexes
Metal hydrides
Zirconium(IV) compounds